They Shall Pay is a 1921 American silent drama film directed by Martin Justice and starring Lottie Pickford, Allan Forrest, and Paul Weigel.

The film's sets were designed by the art director Max Parker.

Cast
 Lottie Pickford as Margaret Seldon 
 Allan Forrest as Allan Forbes 
 Paul Weigel as Henry Seldon 
 Lloyd Whitlock as Courtland Wells 
 George Periolat as Amos Colby 
 Katherine Griffith as Mrs. Yates

References

Bibliography
 Langman, Larry. American Film Cycles: The Silent Era. Greenwood Publishing, 1998.

External links

1921 films
1921 drama films
1920s English-language films
American silent feature films
Silent American drama films
Films directed by Martin Justice
American black-and-white films
Associated Exhibitors films
1920s American films